Heuchlingen is a municipality in the German state of Baden-Württemberg, in Ostalbkreis district.

Population development

2013:	 	1786 
2010:	 	1860 
2000:	 	1816 
1986:	 	1553 
1979:	 	1405

References

Ostalbkreis
Württemberg